Khangaon is a village in Gokak taluk, Belagavi district of Karnataka, India.  the 2011 Census of India, the village comprised , with a population of 3062 people across 609 households.

References 

Villages in Belagavi district